The 2004–05 National Football League was the ninth season of the National Football League, the top Indian professional league for association football clubs, since its inception in 1996. 12 teams took part in the season. Dempo won the league by scoring 47 points in 22 matches. Sporting Clube de Goa won the second position by scoring 45 points in 22 matches. Dudu Omagbemi of Sporting Clube de Goa was the highest goal scorer of the league (21).

League standings

Season awards 
The following awards were given at the conclusion of the season. Dudu Omagbemi of Sporting Clube, who scored 21 goals, was named the best player and best forward for the season.

References

External links 
 9th National Football League at Rec.Sport.Soccer Statistics Foundation
 League home at Rediff.com

National Football League (India) seasons
1
India